Jules Paul Benjamin Delessert (14 February 1773 – 1 March 1847) was a French banker and naturalist. He was an honorary member of the  Académie des Sciences and many species were named from his natural history collections.

Biography
He was born at Lyon, the son of Étienne Delessert (1735–1816), the founder of the first fire insurance company and the first discount bank in France. Their ancestors had moved from Switzerland after 1685. Young Delessert was travelling in England when the French Revolution broke out, but he hastened back to join the Paris National Guard in 1790, becoming an officer of artillery in 1793. His father bought him out of the army, however, in 1795 in order to entrust him with the management of his bank.

Gifted with remarkable energy, he started many commercial enterprises, founding the first cotton factory at Passy in 1801, and a sugar factory in 1802 where Jean-Baptiste Quéruel developed the industrial manufacture of sugar from sugar beet, and for which he was created a baron of the Empire. He sat in the chamber of deputies for many years from 1815, and was a strong advocate for many humane measures, notably the suppression of the Tours or revolving box at the foundling hospital, the suppression of the death penalty, and the improvement of the penitentiary system. He was made regent of the Bank of France in 1802, and was also member of, and, indeed, founder of many, learned and philanthropic societies. In 1818 he founded with Jean-Conrad Hottinger the first savings bank in France, the Groupe Caisse d'Epargne and maintained a keen interest in it until his death in 1847. He is buried in Rue Lekain.

Benjamin had one daughter, Caroline Delessert. In 1858 Caroline married Baron Jean-Henri Hottinguer.

He was also an ardent botanist and conchologist; his botanical library contained 30,000 volumes, of which he published a catalogue Musée botanique de M. Delessert (1845). He also wrote Des avantages de la caisse d'épargne et de prévoyance (1835), Mémoire sur un projet de bibliothèque royale (1836), Le Guide de bonheur (1839), and Recueil de coquilles décrites par Lamarck (1841–42).

His major botanical collaborators were Augustin Pyramus de Candolle and Pedro Cláudio Dinamarquez Clausen.

He was honoured in 1813, when botanist Jean Vincent Félix Lamouroux published Delesseria, which is a genus of red algae belonging to the family Delesseriaceae. A boulevard in the XVIth arrondissement and a road in the Xth arrondissement are named after Delessert.

References

19th-century French botanists
French bankers
Members of the French Academy of Sciences
1773 births
1847 deaths
Regents of the Banque de France